The Sixth Federal Electoral District of Coahuila (VI Distrito Electoral Federal de Coahuila) is one of the 300 Electoral Districts into which Mexico is divided for the purpose of elections to the federal Chamber of Deputies and one of seven such districts in the state of Coahuila.

It elects one deputy to the lower house of Congress for each three-year legislative period, by means of the first past the post system.

District territory
Under the 2005 districting scheme, Coahuila's Sixth District covers the northern half of the municipality of Torreón.

The district's head town (cabecera distrital), where results from individual polling stations are gathered together and collated, is the city of Torreón.

Deputies returned to Congress from this district

LI Legislature
 1979–1982: Francisco José Madero González (PRI)
LII Legislature
 1982–1985:
LIII Legislature
 1985–1988:
LIV Legislature
 1988–1991: Humberto Roque Villanueva (PRI)
LV Legislature
 1991–1994:
LVI Legislature
 1994–1997: Jesús Salvador Hernández Vélez (PRI)
LVII Legislature
 1997–2000: Alberto González Domene (PAN)
LVIII Legislature
 2000–2002: José Guillermo Anaya Llamas (PAN)
 2002–2003: Silvestre Enrique Faya Viesca (PAN)
LIX Legislature
 2003–2006: Laura Reyes Retana (Ind.)
LX Legislature
 2006–2009: Jesús de León Tello (PAN)

References

Federal electoral districts of Mexico
Federal Electoral District 06
Federal Electoral District 06
Fed